

Peerage of England

|Earl of Surrey (1088)||John de Warenne, 6th Earl of Surrey||1240||1304||
|-
|Earl of Warwick (1088)||William de Beauchamp, 9th Earl of Warwick||1267||1298||
|-
|Earl of Gloucester (1122)||Gilbert de Clare, 7th Earl of Gloucester||1262||1295||6th Earl of Hertford
|-
|rowspan="2"|Earl of Arundel (1138)||John FitzAlan, 7th Earl of Arundel||1267||1272||Died
|-
|Richard FitzAlan, 8th Earl of Arundel||1272||1302||
|-
|rowspan="2"|Earl of Norfolk (1140)||Roger Bigod, 4th Earl of Norfolk||1225||1270||Died
|-
|Roger Bigod, 5th Earl of Norfolk||1270||1306||
|-
|Earl of Devon (1141)||Isabella de Fortibus, Countess of Devon||1262||1293||
|-
|Earl of Oxford (1142)||Robert de Vere, 5th Earl of Oxford||1263||1297||
|-
|Earl of Salisbury (1145)||Margaret de Lacy, 4th Countess of Salisbury||1261||1310||
|-
|rowspan="2"|Earl of Hereford (1199)||Humphrey de Bohun, 2nd Earl of Hereford||1220||1275||1st Earl of Essex (1239)
|-
|Humphrey de Bohun, 3rd Earl of Hereford||1275||1298||2nd Earl of Essex
|-
|Earl of Lincoln (1217)||Henry de Lacy, 3rd Earl of Lincoln||1266||1311||
|-
|rowspan="2"|Earl of Cornwall (1225)||Richard, 1st Earl of Cornwall||1225||1272||Died
|-
|Edmund, 2nd Earl of Cornwall||1272||1300||
|-
|Earl of Pembroke (1247)||William de Valence, 1st Earl of Pembroke||1247||1296||
|-
|Earl of Chester (1253)||Edward, Earl of Chester||1253||1272||Succeeded as King of England, and the title merged in the Crown
|-
|Earl of Leicester (1265)||Edmund Plantagenet, 1st Earl of Leicester||1267||1296||1st Earl of Lancaster 
|-
|Earl of Richmond (1268)||John II, Duke of Brittany||1268||1305||
|-
|Baron de Ros (1264)||(Robert de Ros)||1264||1285||
|-
|Baron le Despencer (1264)||Hugh le Despencer, 2nd Baron le Despencer||1265||1326||
|-
|Baron Basset of Drayton (1264)||Ralph Basset, 2nd Baron Basset of Drayton||1265||1299||
|-
|Baron Basset of Sapcote (1264)||Ralph Basset, 1st Baron Basset of Sapcote||1264||1282||

Peerage of Scotland

|Earl of Mar (1114)||Uilleam, Earl of Mar||Abt. 1240||1281||
|-
|Earl of Dunbar (1115)||Patrick III, Earl of Dunbar||1248||1289||
|-
|Earl of Angus (1115)||Gilbert de Umfraville, Earl of Angus||1246||1307||
|-
|rowspan=2|Earl of Atholl (1115)||David I Strathbogie, Earl of Atholl||1264||1270||Died
|-
|John of Strathbogie, Earl of Atholl||1270||1306||
|-
|Earl of Buchan (1115)||Alexander Comyn, Earl of Buchan||Abt. 1243||1289||
|-
|rowspan=2|Earl of Strathearn (1115)||Maol Íosa II, Earl of Strathearn||1245||1271||Died
|-
|Maol Íosa III, Earl of Strathearn||1271||1317||
|-
|rowspan=2|Earl of Fife (1129)||Colbán, Earl of Fife||1266||1270||Died
|-
|Donnchadh III, Earl of Fife||1270||1288||
|-
|Earl of Menteith (1160)||Mary I, Countess of Menteith||1258||1295||
|-
|Earl of Lennox (1184)||Maol Choluim I, Earl of Lennox||1260||1291||
|-
|Earl of Carrick (1184)||Marjorie, Countess of Carrick||1256||1292||
|-
|rowspan=2|Earl of Ross (1215)||Uilleam I, Earl of Ross||1251||1274||Died
|-
|Uilleam II, Earl of Ross||1274||1333||
|-
|Earl of Sutherland (1235)||William de Moravia, 2nd Earl of Sutherland||1248||1307||
|-
|}

Peerage of Ireland

|rowspan=2|Earl of Ulster (1264)||Walter de Burgh, 1st Earl of Ulster||1264||1271||Died
|-
|Richard Óg de Burgh, 2nd Earl of Ulster||1271||1326||
|-
|Baron Athenry (1172)||Peter de Bermingham||1262||1307||
|-
|Baron Kingsale (1223)||Nicholas de Courcy, 3rd Baron Kingsale||1260||1290||
|-
|Baron Kerry (1223)||Maurice Fitzthomas Fitzmaurice, 2nd Baron Kerry||1260||1303||
|-
|rowspan=2|Baron Barry (1261)||David de Barry, 1st Baron Barry||1261||1278||Died
|-
|John Barry, 2nd Baron Barry||1278||1285||
|-
|}

References

 

Lists of peers by decade
1270s in England
1270s in Ireland
13th century in Scotland
13th-century English people
13th-century Irish people
13th-century mormaers
Peers